Michael Murphy (12 June 1854 – 2 September 1890) was an Australian cricketer. He played one first-class cricket match for Victoria in 1874.

See also
 List of Victoria first-class cricketers

References

External links
 

1854 births
1890 deaths
Australian cricketers
Victoria cricketers
Cricketers from Sydney
Melbourne Cricket Club cricketers